Aviezer is a small religious moshav in central Israel. Located seven kilometres south of Beit Shemesh, at the east end of the Elah valley, it falls under the jurisdiction of Mateh Yehuda Regional Council.

History
The moshav was founded on 8 April 1958 by immigrants from Iran and by Cochin Jews from Kochi, being the chief ethnic constituent, and was initially named Adulam 9. It was later renamed after Aviezer Zigmond Gestetner, a former president of the Jewish National Fund in the United Kingdom. It was established on land belonging to the depopulated Palestinian village of Bayt Nattif. Today, the site of Aviezer lies within the "green-line" of the 1949 Armistice Agreements.

Gallery

References

Iranian-Jewish culture in Israel
Moshavim
Populated places established in 1958
Religious Israeli communities
1958 establishments in Israel
Populated places in Jerusalem District
Valley of Elah